Sens is a commune in the Yonne department in Bourgogne-Franche-Comté in north-central France, 120 km from Paris.

Sens is a sub-prefecture and the second city of the department, the sixth in the region. It is crossed by the Yonne and the Vanne, which empties into the Yonne here.

History
The city is said to have been one of the oppida of the Senones, one of the oldest Celtic tribes living in Gaul. It is mentioned as Agedincum by Julius Caesar several times in his Commentarii de Bello Gallico.
The Roman city was built during the first century BC and surrounded by walls during the third (notable parts of the walls still remain, with alterations along the centuries).  It still retains today the skeleton of its Roman street plan. The site was referred to by Ammianus Marcellinus as Senones (oppidum Senonas), where the future emperor Julian faced an Alamannic siege for a few months, but it did not become an administrative center until after the reorganization of the Roman Empire in 375, when it was the chief town of Lugdunensis Quarta.

During the Middle Ages its archbishops held the prestigious role of primate of Gaul and Germany. The bishop of Sens became an archbishop as early as the mid-5th century, but the cult of the traditional founders Savinian and Potentian, not mentioned by Gregory of Tours, did not appear until the 8th century, when they were added to the local recension of the Seventy Apostles. The Hôtel de Sens in Paris was their official residence in that city. The Archdiocese of Sens ruled over the dioceses of Chartres, Auxerre, Meaux, Paris, Orléans, Nevers and Troyes, summarized by the acronym CAMPONT. This city was conquered by a Muslim army in 725 AD, but was abandoned quickly after the death of the commander of the army, Anbasa ibn Suhaym al-Kalbi, from natural causes.

Starting from 1135, the cathedral of Sens, dedicated to Saint Stephen, was rebuilt as one of the first Gothic cathedrals. There, in 1234, Louis IX of France celebrated his wedding to Marguerite of Provence. Sens witnessed the trial of Peter Abelard. Pope Alexander III sojourned for some time in the city, and Thomas Becket spent part of his exile between 1162 and 1165. The Archdiocese of Sens hosted a number of church councils and the first Archbishop of Uppsala was consecrated there. William of Sens was the principal architect of Canterbury Cathedral.

Sens experienced troublesome times during the Wars of Religion. In 1562, 100 of the town’s Huguenot population were killed in the Massacre of Sens.

The city declined after Paris was elevated to archdiocese in 1622. Since 2002, Sens remains an archbishopric (though the incumbent resides in Auxerre since 1929?) but with no metropolitical function (no pallium or marriage appeals).

Despite the creation of new regions, Sens remains subject to the Paris cour d'appel.

Population

Main sights
The Cathedral, one of the first Gothic edifices in France
Archbishops' Palace
Church of St. Maurice
Church of St. Pierre le Rond
House of Abraham
Museum
Serres municipales de Sens, municipal greenhouses

Notable people

Samo (ca.600–ca.658), Frankish merchant and later king (rex) of the 7th century Slavic state known as Samo's Empire
Aprus of Sens, 7thC French priest and hermit. 
Thomas Becket (ca.1119 – 1170), Archbishop of Canterbury, he took refuge in Sens in 1164, where Pope Alexander III was sheltered; venerated as a saint. 
William of Sens (died 1180) 12thC French master mason and architect
Samson ben Abraham of Sens (ca.1150 – ca.1230) rabbi and notable Tosafist.
Joseph ben Nathan Official, 13thC French-Jewish controversialist, probably lived in Sens.
Jacques Almain (d. 1515), theologian at Collège de Navarre, defended conciliarism 
Jacques-François Courtin (1672–1752) a French Dutch Golden Age painter  
Victor Scipion Charles Auguste de La Garde de Chambonas (1750–1830), mayor of Sens, brigadier general and French foreign minister at the beginning of the French Revolution.
Louis Antoine Fauvelet de Bourrienne (1769–1834) diplomat, close relationship with Napoleon Bonaparte.
Louis Jacques Thénard (1777–1857), French chemist, educated at the academy of Sens.
Édouard Charton (1807–1890), an eminent French literary figure.
Adolphe Vuitry (1813–1885) lawyer, economist and politician; governor of the Banque de France, 1863/1864
Charles Levert (1825–1899), French public servant and politician
Maurice Prou (1861–1930) archivist, paleographer, numismatist and historian.
Étienne Mimard (1862–1944), French arms manufacturer
Augusta Hure (1870-1953) the first woman appointed as museum curator in France
Saturnin Fabre (1884–1961), French film actor.

Sport 

Guy Chevalier (1910–1949) field hockey player, competed in the 1928, 1936 & 1948 Summer Olympics.
Bacary Sagna (born 1983), footballer with 439 club caps and 65 for France.
Florian Fritz (born 1984) former rugby union player with over 400 club caps and 34 for France. 
Clément Chantôme (born 1987), footballer with about 300 club caps
Chris Malonga (born 1987), footballer with over 350 club caps and 26 for Congo 
Orlann Ombissa-Dzangue (born 1991) sprinter who specializes in the 100 metres. 
Jean Ambrose (born 1993), footballer with about 70 club caps and 1 for Haiti

Twin towns
 Chester, United Kingdom
 Lörrach, Loerrach International Germany
 Senigallia, Italy
 Vyshhorod, Ukraine
 Fafe, Portugal

See also
Senones
St. Columba of Sens
Archdiocese of Sens
Communes of the Yonne department
St. Wulfram of Sens

References

External links

Tourist Office 
Official website 
Richard Stillwell, ed. Princeton Encyclopedia of Classical Sites, 1976: "Agedincum (Sens), Yonne, France"

Communes of Yonne
Subprefectures in France
Senones
Gallia Lugdunensis
Champagne (province)
People from Sens